The list of shipwrecks in 1959 includes ships sunk, foundered, grounded, or otherwise lost during 1959.

January

1 January

9 January

14 January

18 January

23 January

25 January

27 January

30 January

February

2 February

5 February

7 February

13 February

17 February

19 February

20 February

22 February

25 February

March

3 March

14 March

17 March

21 March

23 March

26 March

30 March

April

12 April

13 April

15 April

19 April

26 April

29 April

May

5 May

8 May

9 May

11 May

13 May

21 May

31 May

Unknown date

June

9 June

15 June

18 June

25 June

July

1 July

3 July

6 July

12 July

17 July

18 July

28 July

29 July

August

1 August

5 August

11 August

18 August

21 August

23 August

24 August

26 August

30 August

31 August

Unknown date

September

4 September

7 September

8 September

10 September

14 September

27 September

Unknown date

October

4 October

18 October

22 October

27 October

28 October

Unknown date

November

13 November

16 November

23 November

24 November

27 October

30 November

Unknown date

December

1 December

6 December

7 December

8 December

9 December

13 December

14 December

16 December

20 December

25 December

30 December

Unknown date

References

See also 

1959
 
Ships